In re Wragg Ltd [1897] 1 Ch 796 is a UK company law case, also relevant for English contract law, concerning shares, and the rule that shares should be exchanged for consideration that is in some sense at least sufficient, not necessarily adequate.

Facts
Mr Wragg and Mr Martin sold their omnibus and livery stable business to a newly incorporated company for £46,300. The company paid by issuing debentures and fully paid shares to Mr Wragg and Mr Martin. The liquidator of Wragg Ltd claimed that the company was (in return for the share issue) worth £18,000 less than the board had decided to pay.

Judgment
Lindley LJ held that the transaction was wholly legitimate. He noted that Ooregum Gold Mining Co of India v Roper decided shares cannot be issued at a discount, or below their nominal value, and continued.

Smith LJ concurred, saying if the consideration is ‘not clearly colourable nor illusory, then, in my judgment, the adequacy of the consideration cannot be impeached by a liquidator unless the contract can also be impeached’.

See also

UK company law
Chappell & Co Ltd v Nestle Co Ltd [1960] AC 87

Notes

References

United Kingdom company case law
Court of Appeal (England and Wales) cases
1897 in case law
1897 in British law